The Regius Chair of Forensic Medicine at the University of Glasgow was founded in 1839 by Queen Victoria.

The chair was occupied for over one sixty years by the same family, when John Glaister Jnr. succeeded his father as Regius Professor. The chair is currently vacant.

Regius Professors of Forensic Medicine
1839 - Robert Cowan
1841 - Harry Rainy
1872 - Pierce Adolphus Simpson
1898 - John Glaister
1931 - John Glaister Jnr
1964 - Gilbert Forbes
1974 - William Arthur Harland
1985 - Alan Albert Watson
1993 - Peter Vanezis

See also
 List of Professorships at the University of Glasgow
 University of Glasgow Medical School

Forensic Medicine
Professorships in medicine
Glasgow
Forensic Medicine, Glasgow
Forensic occupations